Sherri Shepherd (born April 22, 1967) is an American actress, comedian, author, broadcaster, and television personality. She currently hosts the daily syndicated daytime talk show, Sherri. From 2007 to 2014, Shepherd was a co-host of the daytime talk show The View, for which she received multiple Daytime Emmy Award nominations, winning one in 2009. She hosted Dish Nation from 2019 to December 2022, with her final months in limited episodes due to her talk show. She also starred in the sitcoms The Jamie Foxx Show (1999-2001), Less than Perfect (2002–2006), Sherri (2009), Trial & Error (2017–2018), and Mr. Iglesias (2019–2020).

In 2009, she published the book Permission Slips: Every Woman's Guide to Giving Herself a Break. In 2012, she appeared as a contestant on the 14th season of the reality competition series Dancing with the Stars. Shepherd had a recurring role as Angie Jordan on the NBC sitcom 30 Rock and the HBO series The Sex Lives of College Girls and hosted the game show Best Ever Trivia Show.

Early life
Shepherd was born in Chicago, Illinois, the daughter of LaVerne (d. 1991) and Lawrence A. Shepherd (born c. 1947), a church deacon. She is the eldest of three sisters.

Career
Shepherd's first television acting job was starring as Victoria Carlson in the short lived sitcom Cleghorne!, which aired for one season on The WB in 1995. She told Ebony in 2018, "That was the first job that I booked and I was still a legal secretary. My agent told me, 'You can quit your job.' I had that big break ... and then it was canceled. I lost my apartment, my car was repossessed and I was homeless for a year. I slept on everybody's couch. In this business, it's very uncertain. You can be working one day and not working the next."

Shepherd later became recognized for her role as Sheila Yarborough on Jamie Foxx's own sitcom The Jamie Foxx Show from 1996 to 2001 and for recurring roles on the sitcoms Suddenly Susan and Everybody Loves Raymond in the late 1990s, while starring in the show Less Than Perfect in the lead role of Ramona Platt from 2002 to 2006. From 2005 to 2009, Shepherd had a recurring role as Sandra, the girlfriend of character Lenny Davidson, on the FOX sitcom The War at Home. In 2007, she played Rhonda in the IMAX rerelease version of Transformers. From 2007 – 2013, she had a recurring role as Angie, the wife of character Tracy Jordan, on the NBC sitcom 30 Rock. In 2009, she starred for one season in Lifetime Television's Sherri, a sitcom about Shepherd's life. She recurred as Daphne during the final season of How I Met Your Mother in 2013. In the same year, Shepherd appeared on Broadway in Rodgers and Hammerstein's musical production of Cinderella. From 2017 to 2018, Shepherd portrayed Anne Flatch in NBC's mockumentary legal comedy series, Trial & Error. She will produce and star in the comedy series pilot Black Don't Crack.

Television personality
Shepherd has appeared as a guest host and contestant on several television shows such as Who Wants to Be a Millionaire, Rachael Ray, and To Tell The Truth. She co-hosted the 35th Daytime Emmy Awards on June 20, 2008. Shepherd also hosted Nickelodeon's NickMom Night Out special from 2013 to 2014, Shepherd hosted Best Ever Trivia Show on Game Show Network for 65 episodes, beginning on June 10, 2019.  She has appeared regularly as a panelist on Funny You Should Ask since 2017.

In 2006, Shepherd became a frequent guest co-host on ABC's daytime talk show The View. She became a permanent co-host in 2007, debuting in September. Since leaving The View in 2014, Shepherd has continued to make several appearances on the show as a guest host and "lead contributor" throughout 2015 and 2016.

Shepherd was criticized after one 2007 broadcast of The View. The show was often filmed "live", with little or no editing. She stated she did not "believe in evolution. Period." Co-host Whoopi Goldberg asked her, "Is the world flat?" Shepherd responded, "I don't know," and expanded that she "never thought about it". Shepherd later referred to her statement as a "brain fart" brought on by nerves. Barbara Walters and Shepherd talked after that episode: Walters said, "Dear, the Earth is round", and Shepherd responded with: "Barbara, I know that!"

Similar criticism erupted after the December 4, 2007, broadcast of The View when, during a discussion initiated by Joy Behar about Epicurus, Shepherd attempted to assert that Christians existed in classical Greece, and that the Greeks threw them to the lions. When confronted on this point, she further claimed that "Jesus came first" (before Greeks and Romans) and stated, "I don't think anything predated Christians", to which Behar responded: "The Jews."

Shepherd garnered criticism after admitting to never voting partly due to her upbringing as a strict Jehovah's Witness. She was quoted as saying that she just "never knew the dates or anything"; she stated, "I've never voted for anything in my life." In January 2008, Sherri referred to Gospel singer Shirley Caesar as "the black Patti LaBelle." LaBelle, like Caesar, is black.

In 2008, she created controversy on The View due to "flippant" remarks regarding abortion. She later clarified her position, saying her remarks weren't meant to be flippant but rather to inspire other women who may be dealing with guilt after abortions. She cited having multiple abortions in her 20s, suffering from shame and guilt from those experiences, later converting to Christianity. In 2009, Shepherd won the Daytime Emmy Award for Outstanding Talk Show Host alongside Behar, Goldberg, Walters, and Elisabeth Hasselbeck.

In March 2012, Shepherd participated as a celebrity contestant on the fourteenth season of ABC's Dancing with the Stars; her dance partner was Val Chmerkovskiy.

In 2019, Shepherd participated in the second season of Fox's The Masked Singer as the "Penguin".

From October 2021 to June 2022, Shepherd was among the recurring guest hosts of the syndicated daytime talk show The Wendy Williams Show, as its namesake Wendy Williams had been on an indefinite absence from the program due to her medical issues. On February 22, 2022, the show's distributor Debmar-Mercury announced that Shepherd had been signed on to host a new talk show, Sherri, which premiered in the 2022–23 television season as a replacement for Wendy. The series premiered on September 12. In January 2023, the series was renewed for its second and third seasons through 2025.

Other ventures
Shepherd wrote the book Permission Slips: Every Woman's Guide to Giving Herself a Break, published in October 2009. Shepherd also has a co-author credit on Plan D: How to Lose Weight and Beat Diabetes, published in 2013.

Sherri raises funds for the YAI Sherri Shepherd "Believe in Abilities" Fund. YAI supports people of all ages with intellectual and developmental disabilities in achieving the fullest life possible by creating new opportunities for living, loving, working, and learning. YAI is a network of agencies with programs that empower and enhance the lives of thousands of people we support and their families.

In 2009, Shepherd appeared on an episode of WWE SmackDown as the guest manager for professional wrestler MVP, who competed against Dolph Ziggler in a match defending the WWE United States Championship. In 2011, Shepherd offered to pay six months' rent and utilities of homeless former American Gladiators star Debbie Clark (Storm). As of 2015, a project includes a line of wigs and hair add-ins.

Personal life
Shepherd was married to Jeff Tarpley from 2001 to 2009. They have a son, Jeffrey, born in April 2005. Shepherd became engaged to writer Lamar Sally on December 26, 2010. The couple married in Chicago in August 2011 and separated in May 2014. Following the split, Shepherd and Sally welcomed a son via surrogacy in August 2014; Shepherd does not have a biological connection to the child, as he was conceived using a donor egg. The following year, a Pennsylvania appeals court ruled that Shepherd was legally responsible for the child after she challenged the surrogacy contract and sought to remove her name from his birth certificate.

Shepherd has type 2 diabetes after having had pre-diabetes for years. Formerly a Jehovah's Witness, Shepherd is an evangelical Christian.

Filmography

Film

Television

Theatre

Documentary

Comedy Special

Awards and nominations

References

External links

1967 births
20th-century African-American people
20th-century African-American women
20th-century American actresses
20th-century American comedians
21st-century African-American people
21st-century African-American women
21st-century American actresses
21st-century American comedians
21st-century American non-fiction writers
21st-century American women writers
Actresses from Chicago
African-American Christians
African-American actresses
African-American game show hosts
African-American television personalities
African-American television producers
African-American television talk show hosts
African-American women writers
American Christians
American film actresses
American television actresses
American television talk show hosts
American women comedians
American women film producers
American women television personalities
Comedians from Illinois
Daytime Emmy Award for Outstanding Talk Show Host winners
Film producers from Illinois
Former Jehovah's Witnesses
Living people
Television producers from Illinois
Writers from Chicago